Owasco Reformed Church, also known as Reformed Dutch Church of Owasco, is a historic Dutch Reformed church located at Owasco in Cayuga County, New York.  It was built in 1811-1815 and is a large, rectangular, Federal-era frame meeting house at the core of the hamlet of Owasco.  Also located on the property is a two-story, Queen Anne style parsonage built in 1886-1888 and a gable roofed frame barn.

It was listed on the National Register of Historic Places in 2010.

References

External links
Owasco Reformed Church website

Reformed Church in America churches in New York (state)
Federal architecture in New York (state)
Churches completed in 1815
Churches on the National Register of Historic Places in New York (state)
Churches in Cayuga County, New York
National Register of Historic Places in Cayuga County, New York